Knattspyrnufélag Breiðholts, abbreviated as KB, is an Icelandic football club based in the Breiðholt area of the capital, Reykjavík. KB is used as reserve team for Leiknir Reykjavík and does not run a youth setup. It was founded in 2007.

References

External links 
 Official homepage
 Club profile at ksi.is

Football clubs in Iceland
Football clubs in Reykjavík
Association football clubs established in 2007
2007 establishments in Iceland